Joseph Brooks (10 September 1870 – 15 May 1937) was an English cricketer who played first-class cricket for  Derbyshire in 1895 and 1896.

Early years
Brooks was born at South Normanton, Derbyshire, the son of John Brooks, a coal miner, and his wife Maria.

Career
He made his debut for Derbyshire in August 1895 against Hampshire when he made 2 not out in the only innings he played. He played two more games in the 1895 season and two in the 1896 season.

Brooks played seven innings in five first-class matches with an average  of 2,66 and a top score of 6. As last man in, he was only given out three times in his career. He was a left-arm fast-medium bowler and took 2 wickets at an average of 95.00.

Death
Brooks died at Shuttlewood, Derbyshire, at the age of 66.

References

1870 births
1937 deaths
Derbyshire cricketers
English cricketers
People from South Normanton
Cricketers from Derbyshire